Scenic Brook is a neighborhood located in southwest Austin, Texas. Scenic Brook is located in ZIP codes 78735 and 78736. The boundaries are the intersections of Highway 290 and Highway 71 to on the north, south, and east sides, and Covered Bridge Drive and Scenic Brook Drive on the west side. The Pinnacle Campus of Austin Community College is a landmark on the southeast side of the neighborhood.

In 2011, wildfires damaged houses and greenbelt in the southern area of the neighborhood.

Scenic Brook is located in the Austin Independent School District. Austin City Council District 8 covers the Scenic Brook area in along with other parts of southwest Austin.

References

External links
 Oak Hill Gazette
 Southwest Austin News
 Oak Hill Trails

Neighborhoods in Austin, Texas